Events from the year 1733 in Ireland.

Incumbent
Monarch: George II

Events
January – influenza epidemic.
June 25 – Ben and Samuel Burton's Dublin bank failure.
July 2 – completion of Dr Steevens' Hospital in Dublin.
October 24 – Incorporated Society in Dublin for Promoting English Protestant Schools is established to open Irish Charter Schools.

Arts and literature
Samuel Madden publishes Memoirs of the Twentieth Century.

Births

June 11 – Peter Russell, gambler, government official, politician and judge in Upper Canada (d. 1808)
August 1 – Richard Kirwan, scientist (d. 1812)

Full date unknown
Patrick (or William) "Staker" Wallace, a leader of the United Irishmen (d. 1798)

Deaths
February – Séamas Dall Mac Cuarta, poet (b. c.1647?)
December 7 – Edward Lovett Pearce, architect (b. 1699)

References

 
Years of the 18th century in Ireland
1730s in Ireland